Joseph Justus Scaliger (5 August 1540 – 21 January 1609) was a French Calvinist religious leader and scholar, known for expanding the notion of classical history from Greek and Ancient Roman history to include Persian, Babylonian, Jewish and Ancient Egyptian history. He spent the last sixteen years of his life in the Netherlands.

Early life
In 1540, Scaliger was born in Agen, France, to Italian scholar and physician Julius Caesar Scaliger and his wife, Andiette de Roques Lobejac. His only formal education was three years of study at the College of Guienne in Bordeaux, which ended in 1555 due to an outbreak of the bubonic plague. Until his death in 1558, Julius Scaliger taught his son Latin and poetry; he was made to write at least 80 lines of Latin a day.

University and travels

After his father's death, Scaliger spent four years at the University of Paris, where he studied Greek under Adrianus Turnebus. After two months he found he was not in a position to profit from the lectures of the greatest Greek scholar of the time. He read Homer in twenty-one days, and afterwards read other classical Greek poets, orators, and historians, forming a grammar for himself as he went along. At the suggestion of Guillaume Postel, after learning Greek he learned Hebrew, and then Arabic, becoming proficient in both.

His most important teacher was Jean Dorat, who was able not only to impart knowledge but also to kindle enthusiasm in Scaliger. It was to Dorat that Scaliger owed his home for the next thirty years of his life, for in 1563 the professor recommended him to Louis de Chasteigner, the young lord of La Roche-Posay, as a companion in his travels. The two young men formed a close friendship which remained unbroken until Louis's death in 1595. The travellers first went to Rome. Here they found Marc Antoine Muret, who, when at Bordeaux and Toulouse, had been a great favourite and occasional visitor of Julius Caesar Scaliger at Agen. Muret soon recognized the young Scaliger's merits and introduced him to many contacts well worth knowing.

After visiting a large part of Italy, the travellers moved on to England and Scotland, passing through the town of La Roche-Posay on their way. During his time in the British Isles, Scaliger formed an unfavourable opinion of the English. Their inhuman disposition and inhospitable treatment of foreigners especially made a negative impression on him. He was also disappointed at finding only a few Greek manuscripts and, in his opinion, few learned men. It was not until a much later period that he became intimate with Richard Thomson and other Englishmen. Over the course of his travels, he became a Protestant.

France, Geneva, and back to France

On his return to France, he spent three years with the Chastaigners, accompanying them to their different châteaux in Poitou, as the calls of the civil war required. In 1570 he accepted the invitation of Jacques Cujas and proceeded to Valence to study jurisprudence under the greatest living jurist. Here he remained three years, profiting not only by the lectures but even more by the library of Cujas, which filled no fewer than seven or eight rooms and included five hundred manuscripts.

The St Bartholomew's Day Massacre – which occurred just before he was to accompany the bishop of Valence on an embassy to Poland – caused Scaliger to flee, alongside other Huguenots, to Geneva, where he was appointed a professor at the Academy of Geneva. While there, he lectured on Aristotle's Organon and Cicero's De Finibus to much satisfaction for the students, but not appreciating it himself. He hated lecturing and was bored with the persistence of the fanatical preachers, accordingly in 1574 he returned to France and made his home for the next twenty years with Chastaigner.

Of his life during this period we have interesting details and notices in the Lettres françaises inédites de Joseph Scaliger, edited by Tamizey de Larroque (Agen, 1881). Constantly moving through Poitou and the Limousin, as the exigencies of the civil war required, occasionally taking his turn as a guard, at least on one occasion trailing a pike on an expedition against the Leaguers, with no access to libraries, and frequently separated even from his own books, his life during this period seems most unsuited to study. He had, however, what so few contemporary scholars possessed – leisure and freedom from financial cares.

Academic output
It was during this period of his life that he composed and published his books of historical criticism. His editions of the Catalecta (1575), of Festus (1575), of Catullus, Tibullus and Propertius (1577), are the work of a man determined to discover the real meaning and force of his author. He was the first to lay down and apply sound rules of criticism and revision, and to change textual criticism from a series of haphazard guesses into a "rational procedure subject to fixed laws" (Mark Pattison).

These works, despite proving Scaliger's skill among his contemporaries as a Latin scholar and critic, did not go beyond simple scholarship. It was reserved for his edition of Manilius (1579), and his De emendatione temporum (1583), to revolutionize perceived ideas of ancient chronology—to show that ancient history was not confined to that of the Greeks and Romans, but also comprises that of the Persians, the Babylonians and the Egyptians, hitherto neglected, and that of the Jews, hitherto treated as a thing apart; and that the historical narratives and fragments of each of these, and their several systems of chronology, must be critically compared. It was this innovation that distinguished Scaliger from contemporary scholars. Neither they nor those who immediately followed seem to have appreciated his innovation. Instead, they valued his emendatory criticism and his skill in Greek. His commentary on Manilius is a treatise on ancient astronomy, and it forms an introduction to De emendatione temporum; in this work, Scaliger investigates ancient systems of determining epochs, calendars and computations of time. Applying the work of  Nicolaus Copernicus and other modern scientists, he reveals the principles behind these systems.

In the remaining twenty-four years of his life, he expanded on his work in the De emendatione. He succeeded in reconstructing the lost Chronicle of Eusebius—one of the most valuable ancient documents, especially valuable for ancient chronology. This he printed in 1606 in his Thesaurus temporum, in which he collected, restored, and arranged every chronological relic extant in Greek or Latin.

The Netherlands

When Justus Lipsius retired from the University of Leiden in 1590, the university and its protectors, the States-General of the Netherlands and the Prince of Orange, resolved to appoint Scaliger as his successor. He declined; he hated lecturing, and there were those among his friends who erroneously believed that with the success of Henry IV learning would flourish, and Protestantism would be no barrier to his advancement. The invitation was renewed in the most flattering manner a year later; the invitation stated Scaliger would not be required to lecture, and that the university wished only for his presence, while he would be able to dispose of his own time in all respects. This offer Scaliger accepted provisionally. Midway through 1593, he set out for the Netherlands, where he would pass the remaining sixteen years of his life, never returning to France. His reception at Leiden was all that he could have wished for. He received a handsome income; he was treated with the highest consideration. His supposed rank as a prince of Verona, a sensitive issue for the Scaligeri, was recognized. Leiden lying between The Hague and Amsterdam, Scaliger was able to enjoy, besides the learned circle of Leiden, the advantages of the best society of both these capitals. For Scaliger was no hermit buried among his books; he was fond of social intercourse and was himself a good talker.

During the first seven years of his residence at Leiden, his reputation was at its highest point. His literary judgment was unquestioned. From his throne at Leiden he ruled the learned world; a word from him could make or mar a rising reputation, and he was surrounded by young men eager to listen to and profit from his conversation. He encouraged Grotius when only a youth of sixteen to edit Martianus Capella. At the early death of the younger Douza, he wept as at that of a beloved son. Daniel Heinsius, at first his favourite pupil, became his most intimate friend.

At the same time, Scaliger had made numerous enemies. He hated ignorance, but he hated still more half-learning, and most of all dishonesty in argument or quotation. He had no toleration for the disingenuous argument and the misstatements of facts of those who wrote to support a theory or to defend an unsound cause. His pungent sarcasm soon reached the ears of the persons who were its object, and his pen was not less bitter than his tongue. He was conscious of his power, and not always sufficiently cautious or sufficiently gentle in its exercise. Nor was he always right. He trusted much to his memory, which was occasionally treacherous. His emendations, if often valuable, were sometimes absurd. In laying the foundations of a science of ancient chronology he relied sometimes on groundless or even absurd hypotheses, often based on an imperfect induction of facts. Sometimes he misunderstood the astronomical science of the ancients, sometimes that of Copernicus and Tycho Brahe. And he was no mathematician.

Disagreements with the Jesuits
But his enemies were not merely those whose errors he had exposed and whose hostility he had excited by the violence of his language. The results of his method of historical criticism threatened the Catholic controversialists and the authenticity of many of the documents on which they relied. The Jesuits, who aspired to be the source of all scholarship and criticism, saw the writings and authority of Scaliger as a formidable barrier to their claims. Muret in the latter part of his life professed the strictest orthodoxy, Lipsius had been reconciled to the Church of Rome, Isaac Casaubon was supposed to be wavering, but Scaliger was known to be an irreconcilable Protestant. As long as his intellectual supremacy was unquestioned, the Protestants had the advantage in learning and scholarship. His enemies therefore aimed, if not to answer his criticisms or to disprove his statements, yet to attack him as a man and destroy his reputation. This was no easy task, for his moral character was absolutely spotless.

Veronese descent

After several attacks purportedly by the Jesuits, in 1607 a new attempt was made. In 1594 Scaliger had published his Epistola de vetustate et splendore gentis Scaligerae et JC Scaligeri vita. In 1601 Gaspar Scioppius, then in the service of the Jesuits published his Scaliger Hypobolimaeus ("The Supposititious Scaliger"), a quarto volume of more than four hundred pages. The author purports to point out five hundred lies in the Epistola de vetustate of Scaliger, but the main argument of the book is to show the falsity of his pretensions to be of the family of La Scala, and the narrative of his father's early life. "No stronger proof," says Pattison, "can be given of the impressions produced by this powerful philippic, dedicated to the defamation of an individual, than that it had been the source from which the biography of Scaliger, as it now stands in our biographical collections, has mainly flowed."

To Scaliger, the publication of Scaliger Hypobolimaeus was crushing. Whatever his father Julius had believed, Joseph had never doubted himself to be a prince of Verona, and in his Epistola had put forth all that he had heard from his father. He wrote a reply to Scioppius, entitled Confutatio fabulae Burdonum. In the opinion of Pattison, "as a refutation of Scioppius it is most complete"; but there are certainly grounds for dissenting from this judgment. Scaliger purported that Scioppius committed more blunders than he corrected, claiming that the book made untruthful allegations, but he did not succeed in adducing any proof either of his father's descent from the La Scala family, or of any of the events narrated by Julius before he arrived at Agen. Nor does Scaliger attempt a refutation of the crucial point, namely, that William, the last prince of Verona, had no son Nicholas, who would have been the alleged grandfather of Julius.

Complete or not, the Confutatio had little success; the attack attributed to the Jesuits was successful. Scioppius was wont to boast that his book had killed Scaliger. The Confutatio was Scaliger's last work. Five months after it appeared, on 21 January 1609, at four in the morning, he died at Leiden in the arms of his pupil and friend Heinsius. In his will Scaliger bequeathed his renowned collection of manuscripts and books (tous mes livres de langues étrangères, Hebraiques, Syriens, Arabiques, Ethiopiens) to Leiden University Library.

Sources
One notable biography of Joseph Scaliger is that of Jakob Bernays (Berlin, 1855). It was reviewed by Pattison in the Quarterly Review, vol. cviii (1860), since reprinted in the Essays, i (1889), 132–195. Pattison had made many manuscript collections for the life of Joseph Scaliger on a much more extensive scale, which he left unfinished. In writing the above article, Professor Christie had access to and made much use of these manuscripts, which include the life of Julius Caesar Scaliger. The fragments of the life of Joseph Scaliger have been printed in the Essays, i. 196–245. For the life of Joseph, besides the letters published by Tamizis de Larroque (Agen, 1881), the two old collections of Latin and French letters and the two Scaligerana are the most important sources of information. The complete correspondence of Scaliger is now available in eight volumes.
	
For the life of his father Julius Caesar Scaliger, the letters edited by his son, those subsequently published in 1620 by the President de Maussac, the Scaligerana, and his own writings are full of autobiographical matter, are the chief authorities. Jules de Bourousse de Laffore's Etude sur Jules César de Lescale (Agen, 1860) and Adolphe Magen's Documents sur Julius Caesar Scaliger et sa famille (Agen, 1873) add important details to the lives of both father and son. The lives by Charles Nisard – that of Julius et Les Gladiateurs de la république des lettres, and that of Joseph Le Triumvirat littéraire au seizième siècle – are equally unworthy of their author and their subjects. Julius is simply held up to ridicule, while the life of Joseph is almost wholly based on the book of Scioppius and the Scaligerana.

A complete list of the works of Joseph will be found in his life by Jakob Bernays. See also J. E. Sandys, History of Classical Scholarship, ii. (1908), 199–204. A technical biography is Anthony T. Grafton, Joseph Scaliger: A Study in the History of Classical Scholarship, 2 vol. (Oxford, Oxford University Press, 1983, 1993).

See also
History of scholarship
Julian Period – a tricyclic system of years proposed by Scaliger
New Chronology (Fomenko)

References

Works

External links

 
 
 Correspondents of Scaliger: Joseph Justus Scaliger maintained a vast correspondence with European humanists and scholars, whose names are listed here
 The Correspondence of Joseph Justus Scaliger in EMLO
 

People from Agen
1540 births
1609 deaths
16th-century French historians
16th-century Latin-language writers
17th-century Latin-language writers
16th-century French writers
16th-century male writers
17th-century French writers
17th-century French male writers
Chronologists
French classical scholars
French book and manuscript collectors
Academic staff of Leiden University
College of Guienne alumni
University of Paris alumni
Academic staff of the University of Geneva
17th-century Dutch people
French Protestants
Converts to Protestantism
French male non-fiction writers
French people of Italian descent